Lepturoschema penardi is a species of beetle in the family Cerambycidae, and the only species in the genus Lepturoschema. Lepturoschema penardi was described by Xavier Montrouzier in 1861.

References

Enicodini
Beetles described in 1861